The Municipal District of Lesser Slave River No. 124 is a municipal district (MD) in north-central Alberta, Canada. Its municipal office is located in the Town of Slave Lake. Located in Census Division 17, the MD takes its name from Lesser Slave River, which drains Lesser Slave Lake into the Athabasca River.

Geography

Communities and localities 
The following urban municipalities are surrounded by the MD of Lesser Slave River No. 124.
Cities
none
Towns
Slave Lake (location of municipal office)
Villages
none
Summer villages
none

The following hamlets are located within the MD of Lesser Slave River No. 124.
Hamlets
Canyon Creek
Chisholm
Flatbush
Marten Beach
Smith
Wagner
Widewater

The following localities are located within the MD of Lesser Slave River No. 124.
Localities

Assineau
Chisholm Mills
Decrene
Hondo
Kilsyth
Mitsue
Moose Portage

Old Town
Overlea
Ranch
Saulteaux
Spurfield
Tieland

Other places
Port Cornwall

Demographics 

The population of the Municipal District of Lesser Slave River No. 124 according to its 2020 municipal census is 2,811, a  change from its 2014 municipal census population of 3,074. 

In the 2016 Census of Population conducted by Statistics Canada, the MD of Lesser Slave River No. 124 had a population of 2,803 living in 1,090 of its 1,310 total private dwellings, a  change from its 2011 population of 2,929.

Education
Southern parts of the MD are within Pembina Hills Public Schools, which formed in 1995 as a merger of three school districts.

See also 
List of communities in Alberta
List of municipal districts in Alberta

References

External links 

 
Lesser Slave River